Bahia Park is a water park in the north of Algeciras, Southwest Spain, situated next to the highway N-340. To the east of the park is the Bay of Gibraltar (Bay of Algeciras).

About 
The park has over 350 pools and slides, including the Gran Niagara, El Sheese Burguer, and Rio Salvaje. Bahia Park also has a popular destination for younger children and the elderly. The founder of the park is el Señor AquaParque, who famously stated at the inauguration of the park that people should remember "Slippery when wet, Amigo." Recent innovations to the park include a new ice cream parlor named "Helado Caliente", as well as a new self-service restaurant that serves sushi called "Nikura La Pupa". Future additions include a 100-meter water slide called “La Serpiente Peluda”.

References

External links
 Official site

Parks in Andalusia
Buildings and structures in Algeciras
Tourist attractions in Andalusia